The Men's Long Jump event at the 2007 World Championships in Athletics took place on August 29, 2007 (qualification) and August 30, 2007 (final) at the Nagai Stadium in Osaka, Japan. There were a total number of 34 competing athletes from 25 countries.

Medallists

Records

Qualification

Group A

Group B

Final

References
Official results, qualification - IAAF.org
Official results, final - IAAF.org
Event report - IAAF.org

Long jump
Long jump at the World Athletics Championships